Ourthe was a department of the French First Republic and French First Empire in present-day Belgium and Germany. It was named after the river Ourthe (Oûte). Its territory corresponded more or less with that of the present-day Belgian province of Liège and a small adjacent region in North Rhine-Westphalia in Germany. It was created on 1 October 1795, when the Austrian Netherlands and the Prince-Bishopric of Liège were officially annexed by the French Republic. Before this annexation, the territory included in the department had lain partly in the Bishopric of Liège, the Abbacy of Stavelot-Malmedy, the Duchies of Limburg  and Luxembourg, and the County of Namur.

After Napoleon was defeated in 1814, most of the department became part of the United Kingdom of the Netherlands as the province of Liège. The easternmost part (Eupen, Malmedy, Sankt Vith, Kronenburg, Schleiden) became part of the Prussian Rhine Province; part of this (Eupen, Malmedy and Sankt Vith) was taken back into Liège province after the First World War, under the Treaty of Versailles.

Administration

The Chef-lieu of the department was Liège. The department was subdivided into the following three arrondissements and cantons:

 Liège: Dalhem, Fléron, Glons, Herve, Hollogne-aux-Pierres, Liège (4 cantons), Louveigné, Seraing and Waremme.
 Huy: Avennes, Bodegnée, Ferrières, Héron, Huy, Landen and Nandrin.
 Malmedy: Aubel, Néau, Kronenbourg, Limbourg, Malmedy, Saint Vith, Schleiden, Spa, Stavelot, Verviers and Vielsalm.

Prefects
The Prefect was the highest state representative in the department.

Secretaries-General
The Secretary-General was the deputy to the Prefect.

Subprefects of Huy

Subprefects of Liège
The office of Subprefect of Liège was held by the Prefect until 1811.

Subprefects of Malmedy

References

Former departments of France in Belgium
Former departments of France in Germany
1795 establishments in France
History of Liège Province